Graham Miller is an English former professional darts player who competed in British Darts Organisation (BDO) events in the 1980s and 1990s.

Career

At the 1992 BDO World Darts Championship, Miller defeated Belgian Frans Devooght 3–1 in the first round and former World Champion Bob Anderson 3–2 in the second en route to the quarter-finals where he was defeated 3–4 by another former World Champion, John Lowe. He also played in the Winmau World Masters the same year, losing to Alan Warriner in the first round. He made another World Championship in 1993 losing in the first round to Raymond van Barneveld.

Prior to his World Championship appearances, Miller reached the final of the 1990 Dutch Open, losing to Leo Laurens. He also reached the semi finals of the 1990 French Open.

Miller also appeared on Bullseye in 1993, scoring 305 for charity, and You Bet in 1992.

World Championship results

BDO

 1992: Quarter-finals (lost to John Lowe 3–4)
 1993: 1st round (lost to Raymond van Barneveld 2–3)

External links
Player profile on Darts Database

English darts players
Year of birth missing (living people)
Living people
British Darts Organisation players